State by State: A Panoramic Portrait of America is a collection of pieces about the United States, with one essay on each of the fifty states. It was conceived of and edited by Matt Weiland and Sean Wilsey.

Background
Weiland and Wilsey stated that they were inspired by the Federal Writers Project of the 1930s, in which the US government helped to create jobs by sending writers across the country and commissioning pieces on their sights and experiences. The two previously edited Thinking Fan's Guide to the World Cup, in which they commissioned 32 authors to write pieces on the 32 countries competing in the 2006 World Cup; they decided a similar approach could be taken with the United States.

Both Weiland and Wilsey decided that they wanted a mixture of approaches for the collection; while several well-known authors (e.g., Ha Jin, Jhumpa Lahiri, Dave Eggers) were included, they deliberately avoided certain authors that were closely associated with a particular state - for instance, Garrison Keillor with Minnesota, or Carl Hiaasen with Florida. The collection has a mix of familiarity, with some authors writing about places in which they have lived their entire lives, while others visited the state for the first time.

Editing process
Editors Matt Weiland and Sean Wilsey both agree that they were heavy, interactive editors. "I mean no dishonor to any of the writers to say that we worked very closely with them all to revise as much as possible, to make every piece as lasting and solid and convincing as possible," Weiland told Bookslut. "And I take great pride in that kind of work. I've done it on The Baffler and on Granta and now at The Paris Review. And to Sean, likewise, that means a lot to him—he did it at The New Yorker and continues to do it for McSweeney's....I think [the writers] saw very quickly we wanted to make a book that would still be read decades from now...and that meant...not even taking their A-minus work, but pushing them for their absolute best." Each essay, Weiland said, went through at least six rounds of edits.

Editorial point of view
Weiland told Bookslut that State by State had served for both its editors as "a kind of reminder of the many things we [as Americans] have to be confident about.... Despite many reasons not to feel optimistic, chiefly during the last eight years of the Bush administration—deep down, I think we’re all right." Wilsey told Brooklyn Rail that he was sorry the late David Foster Wallace had declined to be in the book: "Nobody gets at what makes America the extravagantly sad country it is like Wallace did." Asked whether he hates any states, Wilsey replied, "I hate Maine. I hate New England. It's so claustrophobic, no vistas, the landscape is constantly choking you. The people in New England just don't seem kind; they're all hardened and beaten down by the harsh winters. As a Californian, you're not always kind, but you're always nice, and within the framework of niceness you can either be mellow or stoked. I'm a stoked Californian. New England somehow flattens that. Granted, I went to boarding school there for three years, and those were some of the worst years of my life, so that's probably a big part of my dislike for it."

Presentation to Barack Obama

As he documented in an essay for The Guardian, Sean Wilsey personally presented a copy of State by State to Barack Obama in late 2008. Wilsey was invited to attend an event after donating his portion of the advance for the book to Obama's campaign. "When he turned to shake my hand, for some reason I chose to address him by his first name, saying, 'Barack, I brought you this book.'" Six photographs were taken of the handover. "As I handed it to him I was thinking we, all of us, did this for you. I think you can see that in the [accompanying] picture." Obama was very interested in the book and began reading it in front of Wilsey.

Reception
State by State was widely reviewed. The New York Times Book Review expressed that it was "greater than the sum of its excellent parts," while the Boston Globe concluded similarly it was "impressive," and Salon pronounced that the book would provide "ideal nightstand reading." To The New York Observer the anthology was also greater than its parts, heralding "a sign of progress, a ray of hope." Among multiple other positive reviews included The Los Angeles Times, lauding "an antidote to the oversimplifying red state/blue state rubric"; The Denver Post, which enthused "a euphoric collection"; and PopMatters, which commended the matching of writer to state. In 2021, amidst calls for a new Federal Writers' Project to rehabilitate the country and its writers in the wake of the COVID-19 pandemic, PopMatters revisited State by State in a deep dive, finding it a failure on its own terms. Purporting to remedy ignorance, writers continually exhibit it. Major cities such as Miami, Detroit, and Baltimore are relegated to a couple of words or passing put-down. Affluent white suburbs receive inordinate attention, even in many of the least white states; authors discuss their own puberty in lieu of attention to matters such as public schools, socio-economic realities, and state-wide particularities and problems. Most concerning, the book is rife with hoax-like claims, for example "no one ever" feels at home in Massachusetts; "the Poet" is one of "three distinct types" of Michiganders; the "typical Vermonter" is "homosexual"; the state of Virginia is "a necropolis"; and "all Montanans" have in common "a love of William Shakespeare." Glaring omissions include potatoes, not mentioned in "Idaho"; bourbon, bluegrass, horses and the Kentucky Derby, not referenced in "Kentucky"; Phoenix, which never makes an appearance in "Arizona"; retirees/the elderly, receiving under a sentence of coverage in "Florida"; and state pride, nonexistent in the whole country according to "South Carolina," yet on the contrary the essay on Texas claims Texans have a lot of it. "Missouri" is about Bosnians despite one of the lowest immigration populations in the country, "Iowa" is about Mexicans, but "Arizona" reports exclusively on white people. PopMatters compared State by State unfavorably to These United States, a 1920s book featuring state essay portraits by Sherwood Anderson, Willa Cather, Theodore Dreiser, W. E. B. DuBois, H. L. Mencken, Sinclair Lewis, Edmund Wilson, and urged writers/editors hoping to do an updated portrait of the country to emulate the seriousness, knowledgeability, and wit of the earlier generation of writers, who stuck to the assignment to bring out the individuality of the states. These United States also received more serious, responsible reviews. The decline in reviewing and editorial standards notwithstanding, State by State remains one of the most warmly embraced titles of its publication year, with three major media outlets naming it a best book of 2008: Entertainment Weekly, The Village Voice, and NPR.

Distribution to schools and related coverage

Select institutions received complimentary copies of State by State. Many educators received the book with respectful interest and enthusiasm. On the website The Millions, a teacher asked whether he should assign the book in his 21st century literature class. It was one of four tomes he was considering; the others were "[Charles] Bock's Beautiful Children, [Joshua] Ferris' Then We Came to the End, and Brock Clarke's An Arsonist's Guide to Writers' Homes in New England. "My students are really intelligent, and so just about anything is fair game." Millions contributor Edan Lepucki responded, "Of the four you're considering teaching, I think State by State is the best, since it showcases so many great writers. While I enjoyed Joshua Ferris's Then We Came to the End, I think a workplace narrative would be lost on most teenagers."

Professor Tyler Cowen, on the site Marginal Revolution: Small Steps to a Much Better World, noted that he was thinking of assigning State by State to his graduate students at Berlin's Freie Universität along with Alexis de Tocqueville's Democracy in America.

Manhattan's progressive Calhoun School used State by State for its Upper School students in 2012 as required summer reading. The school assigned fifteen essays, two of which are graphic essays, or comic strips. "There's interesting material in every essay and we are certain that this book will spark a wide variety of interesting conversations between students, teachers and parents," the school noted on its website.

Matt Weiland and two of his writers were hosted by a Milwaukee high school for a reading at an assembly. "I wasn't sure what high school students would make of it, but we were careful to select the pieces with the most drinking and the most sex," Weiland told Bookslut. Columbia, the alumni magazine of Columbia University, of which Weiland is a graduate, profiled him in an article called "This Land Is Weiland" and praised him as "a consummate intellectual".

Essays

 Alabama - George Packer
 Alaska - Paul Greenberg
 Arizona - Lydia Millet
 Arkansas - Kevin Brockmeier
 California - William T. Vollmann
 Colorado - Benjamin Kunkel
 Connecticut - Rick Moody
 Delaware - Craig Taylor
 Florida - Joshua Ferris
 Georgia - Ha Jin
 Hawaii - Tara Bray Smith
 Idaho - Anthony Doerr
 Illinois - Dave Eggers
 Indiana - Susan Choi
 Iowa - Dagoberto Gilb
 Kansas - Jim Lewis
 Kentucky - John Jeremiah Sullivan
 Louisiana - Joshua Clark
 Maine - Heidi Julavits
 Maryland - Myla Goldberg
 Massachusetts - John Hodgman
 Michigan - Mohammed Naseehu Ali
 Minnesota - Philip Connors
 Mississippi - Barry Hannah
 Missouri - Jacki Lyden
 Montana - Sarah Vowell
 Nebraska - Alexander Payne
 Nevada - Charles Bock
 New Hampshire - Will Blythe
 New Jersey - Anthony Bourdain
 New Mexico - Ellery Washington
 New York - Jonathan Franzen
 North Carolina - Randall Kenan
 North Dakota - Louise Erdrich
 Ohio - Susan Orlean
 Oklahoma - S. E. Hinton
 Oregon - Joe Sacco
 Pennsylvania - Andrea Lee
 Rhode Island - Jhumpa Lahiri
 South Carolina - Jack Hitt
 South Dakota - Said Sayrafiezadeh
 Tennessee - Ann Patchett
 Texas - Cristina Henríquez
 Utah - David Rakoff
 Vermont - Alison Bechdel
 Virginia - Tony Horwitz
 Washington - Carrie Brownstein
 West Virginia - Jayne Anne Phillips
 Wisconsin - Daphne Beal
 Wyoming - Alexandra Fuller

Afterword: Washington, D.C. - A Conversation with Edward P. Jones

External links
 Interview at WorldHum
 New York Times review

2008 non-fiction books
2008 anthologies
Essay anthologies
Books about the United States
HarperCollins books